Aradus falleni is a species of flat bug in the family Aradidae. It is found in the Caribbean Sea, Central America, North America, and South America.

References

Aradidae
Articles created by Qbugbot
Insects described in 1860